Bats are flying mammals.

Bats may also refer to:

Film and television 
 Bats (film), a 1999 horror film
 Bats!, episode from My Little Pony: Friendship Is Magic (season 4)

Music 
 The Bats (South African band)
 Bats (Irish band)
 The Bats (New Zealand band), a rock band
 "Bats!", a song by The Bronx
 The Bats, a short-lived American band formed by Jon Brion in 1982
 The Bats, an early 1980s San Francisco area rock band related to The Sorentinos

Other uses 
 Bats people, a small Nakh-speaking community in the country of Georgia
 Bats language, the language spoken by the Bats people
 Bats, Landes, a commune in France
 Louisville Bats, a minor league baseball team

People with the surname 
 Joël Bats, a former French goalkeeper and international footballer
 Rob Bats, Dutch politician

See also 
 Bat (disambiguation)
 BAT (disambiguation)
 BATS (disambiguation)